Athallia holocarpa is a species of lichenised fungus in the Teloschistaceae family. It was first described as Verrucaria oblitterata var. holocarpa  by Georg Franz Hoffman in 1796, and transferred to the new genus, Athallia, in 2013 by Ulf Arup, Ulrik Søchting, and Patrik Frödén.

References

External links
Athallia holocarpa occurrence data and images from GBIF

Lichens described in 1796
Taxa named by Georg Franz Hoffmann
Lichen species
Teloschistales